Wayne Schmidt (born October 6, 1966) is a Republican member of the Michigan Senate and former member of the Michigan House of Representatives. He has represented Grand Traverse (and formerly Kalkaska) County in the 37th district since January 1, 2015 and formerly represented 104th District in the Michigan House.

On September 16, 2013, Wayne announced his candidacy to succeed Howard Walker for the 37th Michigan Senate seat and won the election in November 2014.

References

Living people
Republican Party members of the Michigan House of Representatives
Republican Party Michigan state senators
1966 births
21st-century American politicians